Seabury Stanton (October 9, 1892 – October 19, 1971) was an industrialist from New Bedford, Massachusetts who ran Berkshire Hathaway prior to its takeover by Warren Buffett in 1964.

Biography

Early life and career
Seabury Stanton was born on Oct. 9, 1892 in New Bedford, Massachusetts. His father and grandfather had been Yankee whaling captains in New Bedford. He attended the local schools, the New Bedford Textile School, and Harvard University, where he graduated in the class of 1915. The following year he married Jean Kellogg Austin (1892–1976) and began work in textile manufacturing as the treasurer for the Hathaway Manufacturing Company. Hathaway Manufacturing eventually became Berkshire Hathaway after merging with Berkshire Fine Spinning Associates in 1955, becoming the largest surviving textile manufacturer in New England with 15 mills. The company was founded in the nineteenth century with Horatio Hathaway's profits from whaling and the China Trade, but the textile industry in New England declined after World War I and didn't recover until after the Great Depression with the outbreak of World War II. In the late 1950s the industry was again in decline, facing low-cost competition from elsewhere in the United States and abroad. Stanton managed the company as president and his son Jack served as treasurer. Jack Stanton was expected to take over as president, but the Stantons were ousted before that took place. Seabury's brother, Otis Stanton, managed sales at the company and often conflicted with his brother, eventually selling his shares to Warren Buffett after a meeting at the Wamsutta Club.

Seabury Stanton was a miller and a manager with an overriding aim to keep the business going but he was not a financial expert and he continued to plough back most of the company’s earnings into working capital, despite ever decreasing cotton prices, resulting from increased competition at home and abroad.

Ousting of Stanton by Buffett
In 1962 Warren Buffett began buying shares of Berkshire because he thought the company was selling at a discount to its actual value after noticing a pattern in the price direction of its stock whenever the company closed a mill. Eventually Buffett acknowledged that the textile business was waning and the company's financial situation was not going to improve. In 1964 Stanton made a verbal tender offer of $11 per share for the company to buy back Buffett's shares. Buffett agreed to the deal. A few weeks later Buffett received the tender offer in writing, but the tender offer was for only $11.  Buffett later admitted that this lower (undercutting offer) made him angry.  Instead of selling at the slightly lower price, Buffett decided to buy more of the stock to take control of the company and fire Stanton.

Personal life
Seabury Stanton was Chairman and Director of the Northern Textile Association for many terms and an avid sailor in his free time. Stanton also published a book on Berkshire, titled Berkshire Hathaway, Inc. A saga of courage.  Stanton died on October 19, 1971, and is buried in Dartmouth, Massachusetts.

Bibliography

References

1892 births
1971 deaths
People from New Bedford, Massachusetts
American chief executives
Harvard University alumni
Berkshire Hathaway people